In molecular biology, the CodY protein family consists of several bacterial GTP-sensing transcriptional pleiotropic repressor CodY proteins. CodY has been found to repress the dipeptide transport operon (dpp) of Bacillus subtilis in nutrient-rich conditions. The CodY protein also has a repressor effect on many genes in Lactococcus lactis during growth in milk.

References

Protein domains